The 1st Zhaoshang Cup'''''' began on 5 March 2011 and concluded on 6 March. Team China defeated Team Korea 6–4.

Teams

First round

Second round

Total

References 

2011 in go
International Go competitions